24-bit is a reference to a 24-bit length of data or memory addressing.

24-bit may also refer to :
 24-bit color, color data types
 A bit depth used in digital audio, see Audio bit depth
 ICAO 24-bit address, a unique ID given to aircraft using an Aviation transponder interrogation mode
 24-bit hex code, data used in Transponders (aeronautics)